Dębno  is a village in Brzesko County, Lesser Poland Voivodeship, in southern Poland. It is the seat of the gmina (administrative district) called Gmina Dębno.

The village has a population of 1,400.

References

Villages in Brzesko County